Robert Moreland (born November 10, 1938) is an American former basketball coach. He served as the head coach of the Texas Southern Tigers from 1975 to 2001, and 2007 to 2008. Moreland has the most wins as a coach in Tigers history with 406 victories. Moreland led the Tigers to a NAIA championship in 1977 and was named the Southwestern Athletic Conference (SWAC) Coach of the Year five times.

Moreland is a native of Utica, Mississippi, and attended Hinds County Agricultural High School and Utica Junior College. He received an athletic scholarship to Tougaloo College where he participated in basketball, football and track and field. Moreland graduated from Tougaloo in 1962. He began his coaching career at Greer High School in Carthage, Mississippi, during the 1962–63 season. Moreland served as head coach of the basketball team at Utica Junior College from 1963 to 1975. He was appointed head coach of the Texas Southern Tigers in 1975 by athletic director Rod Paige, who had first met when Moreland was a high school student and Paige was practice teaching at his school. Moreland led the Tigers to the NCAA tournament in 1990, 1994 and 1995.

Moreland was fired as head coach by the Tigers in 2001 but remained as a professor at Texas Southern University. In 2007, he agreed to return to the Tigers as an interim head coach for the 2007–08 season and accumulated a 7–25 record during his final season of coaching.

The Tigers renamed the basketball court of H&PE Arena in Moreland's honor. He was named to the SWAC Hall of Fame in 2007.

References

External links
Coaching record

1938 births
Living people
African-American basketball coaches
African-American basketball players
American men's basketball coaches
American men's basketball players
Basketball coaches from Mississippi
College men's basketball head coaches in the United States
High school basketball coaches in Mississippi
People from Utica, Mississippi
Texas Southern Tigers men's basketball coaches
Tougaloo College alumni
21st-century African-American people
20th-century African-American sportspeople